Henry Brewer Metcalf (April 2, 1829 – October 5, 1904) was an American prohibitionist and politician who served as the Prohibition Party's gubernatorial candidate thrice and vice presidential nominee in 1900.

Life

Henry Brewer Metcalf was born in Boston, Massachusetts on April 2, 1829, and attended public schools in the city. When he was 15 he was apprenticed to a dry goods importing and jobbing company in Boston to aid his family's finances. In 1856, he received a Master of Arts degree from Tufts College in Massachusetts. In 1867, he helped to form the Boston Button Company as the firm's senior partner and in 1874 he moved to Rhode Island where he established the Pawtucket Haircloth Company. He later formed the Campbell Machine Company in Boston which made machinery to make shoes. He later served as a Trustee of Tufts College and also as President of the Trustees of Tufts College.

He was a member of the Whig Party until its dissolution and then joined the Republican Party until 1872 when he joined the Liberal Republicans and supported Horace Greeley for president although he later returned following the party's dissolution. In 1874, he assisted in the reorganization of Pawtucket, Rhode Island's city government, being elected to the Winchester city council. In 1885, he was elected to Rhode Island's state senate and served for one term.

Despite his unsuccessful attempt at reelection to the state senate he was a leader in pushing for a constitutional amendment to ban the sale of liquor in Rhode Island and served as the president of the Rhode Island Temperence Union. In 1886, he joined the Prohibition Party and served as its gubernatorial candidate in 1893, 1894, and 1900.

In 1900, he served as a delegate to the Prohibition national convention and aided in the nomination of John G. Woolley for the party's presidential nomination. He won the Prohibition Party's vice presidential nomination with 349 delegates against Thomas R. Caskardon's 132 delegates and E. L. Eaton's 113 delegates.

Shortly before his death he was a member of the American Protective Tariff League of New York and vice president of the American Anti-Imperialist League. In 1904, he was selected to be the Prohibition Party's gubernatorial candidate again, but he died in Pawtucket, Rhode Island on October 5, 1904, after suffering a series of strokes at the age of 75 and was replaced by William E. Brightman.

Electoral history

References

1829 births
1904 deaths
American temperance activists
19th-century American politicians
Politicians from Boston
Rhode Island Prohibitionists
Republican Party Rhode Island state senators
Prohibition Party (United States) vice presidential nominees
Candidates in the 1900 United States presidential election